Dactylosphaerium is a genus of green algae, in the class Trebouxiophyceae.

References

External links

Scientific references

Scientific databases
 AlgaTerra database
 Index Nominum Genericorum

Trebouxiophyceae
Trebouxiophyceae genera